Antaeotricha mustela is a moth in the family Depressariidae. It was described by Lord Walsingham in 1912. It is found in Panama.

The wingspan is 19-21 mm. The forewings are whitish grey, suffused and sprinkled with brownish mouse-colour, and with three, oblique, transverse, darker brownish fuscous streaks—the first, from the costa at about one-sixth, slightly dilated on the fold and on the dorsum before the middle; the second, from before the middle of the costa, slightly wavy, passing the outer end of the cell, where it forms a short outward streak, descending to the dorsum with some outward suffusion at one-third from the termen. The third streak approaches the middle of the termen in its long outwardly oblique curve and reverts to the tornus, a series of somewhat connected spots of the same colour following the margin beyond it. The costa is very narrowly clean whitish grey. The hindwings are brownish grey.

References

Moths described in 1912
mustela
Moths of Central America